David Wayne Richardson (December 24, 1955 – January 18, 2021) was an American television writer and producer who wrote for The Simpsons ("Homer Loves Flanders"), Malcolm in the Middle, Two and a Half Men, and F Is for Family. Richardson, a cancer survivor for nearly thirty years, died of heart failure in early 2021.

Filmography
Writer
Zoobilee Zoo (3 episodes, 1986)
The Pat Sajak Show (2 episodes, 1989)
Star Street: The Adventures of the Star Kids (1989)
Grand (4 episodes, 1990)
Empty Nest (7 episodes, 1991–1993)
Phenom (2 episodes, 1993)
The Simpsons (1 episode, 1994)
"Homer Loves Flanders" (1994)
The John Larroquette Show (1 episode, 1995)
Local Heroes (2 episodes, 1996)
Soul Man (1 episode, 1997)
Manhattan, AZ (2 episodes, 2000)
Malcolm in the Middle (3 episodes, 2000)
What About Joan (2001)
Ed (1 episode, 2002)
Married to the Kellys (1 episode, 2003)
Two and a Half Men (9 episodes, 2009–2011)
F Is for Family (2 episodes, 2015)

Producer
Phenom (1993)
The Simpsons (11 episodes, 1993–1994)
Malcolm in the Middle (12 episodes, 2000)
Manhattan, AZ (2000)
Ed (5 episodes, 2002)
My Big Fat Greek Life (2003)
Married to the Kellys (4 episodes, 2003)
Peep Show (2008)
Two and a Half Men (7 episodes, 2009–2010)

Awards and nominations
1995, won Humanitas Prize, "30 minute category" for The John Larroquette Show

References

External links
 

1955 births
2021 deaths
American television producers
American television writers
Place of birth missing
American male television writers
20th-century American screenwriters
20th-century American male writers
21st-century American screenwriters
21st-century American male writers
Place of death missing